Route 21 may refer to:

Route 21 (MTA Maryland), a bus route in Baltimore, Maryland
London Buses route 21
Shanghai Metro Line 21, a subway line in Shanghai

See also
List of highways numbered 21

21